The Nair are a group of Indian Hindu castes.

Nair may also refer to:

 Nair (hair removal), a hair removal product
 National Academy of Indian Railways (NAIR), Vadodara, Gujarat, India

Places

Islands
 Nair (Mauritania)

Lakes
 Lai Nair, Graubünden, Switzerland
 Lej Nair (Bernina), Switzerland
 Lej Nair (Silvaplana), Switzerland

Mountains
Piz Nair, Albula Alps in Switzerland
Piz Nair (Glarus Alps), Switzerland 
Piz Nair (Sesvenna Alps), Switzerland

People with the surname 
 Anita Nair (born 1966), Indian English-language writer
 Anusree (full name, Anusree Nair)
 Arjun Nair, Indian cricketer
 Balan K. Nair, actor
 Billy Nair, South African politician
 Devan Nair, 3rd President of Singapore
 K. K. Nair, Kerala politician
 Mira Nair, film director
 M. T. Vasudevan Nair, Indian author 
 Nair de Tefé, Brazil's first female cartoonist
 Navya Nair, actress
 Preethi Nair, author
 Ramankutty Nair, Kathakali dancer
 Sami Nair, French politician 
 S R Nair, entrepreneur
 V. Madhusoodhanan Nair, Indian poet
 Vinita Nair, journalist
 V. K. B. Nair, police officer
 V. Parmeswaran Nair, physicist

See also
 Nair-san (disambiguation)
 McNair, a surname